Lake Manantali is a large artificial lake, formed by the 1989 construction of the Manantali Dam, on the Bafing River in Mali. Its northern point is located 90 km to the south-east of the city of Bafoulabé.

Size
Lake Manantali  covers 477 km2 and contains 11.3 billion m3 of water.  Its formation forced 12,000 people from their homes and flooded 120 km2 of forest.  The lake largely ended the flood patterns on both the Bafing and Senegal Rivers, compromising traditional agriculture which depended upon seasonal flooding.  The lake has created benefits as well: consistent navigation downstream of the dam, irrigation of surrounding land, and a source for commercial fishing. The dam itself provides hydroelectric power through much of the region.

References

Knaap, M. van der. Status of fish stocks and fisheries of thirteen medium-sized African reservoirs. CIFA Technical Paper. No. 26. Rome, FAO. 1994. 107p.

External links
Satellite view of the Bafing River valley before and after the formation of Lake Manantali.

Manantali